Flaoui or Fleywe  or Flaoueh    is a small village located  northwest of Baalbek, Lebanon in Baalbek District, Baalbek-Hermel Governorate, Lebanon. It is located near the north–south road that runs from Bodai to Chlifa.

A Heavy Neolithic archaeological site of the Qaraoun culture is located in the area on fielded slopes of a small valley facing the Beqaa valley. It was discovered by Lorraine Copeland and Frank Skeels in 1965 with materials examined by Henri Fleisch. Worked tools were found made from abundant nodules of silicious, grey-yellow limestone. The material suggested to be Heavy Neolithic consisted of massive, rough cores and flakes with another group being found that showed resemblance to an assemblage termed by Fleisch the Micro-Mousterian. The site was under cultivation in 1966.

References

External links
 Flaoueh, Localiban 
Flaoui on www.tiptopglobe.com

Populated places in Baalbek District
Archaeological sites in Lebanon
Heavy Neolithic sites
Neolithic settlements